Alfred Leroy Burt, FRSC (1888–1971) was a Canadian historian. A historian of Canada, with a particular interest in the relationship between French and English Canada, Burt was professor of history at the University of Alberta, then at the University of Minnesota from 1930 to 1957.

Born in Listowel, Ontario, Burt was educated at the University of Toronto and the University of Oxford, where he was a Rhodes scholar.

A fellow of the Royal Society of Canada, Burt won its J. B. Tyrrell Historical Medal in 1946. He was also president of the Canadian Historical Association.

References 

1888 births
1971 deaths
20th-century Canadian historians
Historians of Canada
Fellows of the Royal Society of Canada
Canadian Rhodes Scholars
Academic staff of the University of Alberta
University of Minnesota faculty
University of Toronto alumni